Tennevoll or Tennevollen is the administrative centre of Lavangen Municipality in Troms og Finnmark county, Norway. The village lies about  straight east of the town of Harstad. Tennevoll is located at the end of the Lavangsfjorden, along the river Spansdalselva, which flows through the Spansdalen valley.

References

Villages in Troms
Lavangen